Arthur Milton Brown (October 14, 1884 – November 20, 1980) was an American football and basketball coach.  He served as the head football coach at the DePauw University from 1907 to 1909, Grinnell College from 1910 to 1912, and Middlebury College from 1918 to 1920 and again in 1945, compiling a career college football coaching  record of 34–29–7.  Brown was also the head basketball coach at DePauw from 1907 to 1910 and four stints at Middlebury (1918–1919, 1920–1922, 1942–1942, 1945–1946), tallying a career college basketball coaching mark of 33–64.

Brown was a graduate of Williams College.

Head coaching record

Football

References

External links
 

1884 births
1980 deaths
American football halfbacks
DePauw Tigers football coaches
DePauw Tigers men's basketball coaches
Grinnell Pioneers football coaches
Middlebury Panthers athletic directors
Middlebury Panthers football coaches
Middlebury Panthers men's basketball coaches
Williams Ephs football players
Sportspeople from Troy, New York